Morné Joubert (born ) is a South African rugby union player for the Griffons (rugby union) in the Currie Cup and the Rugby Challenge. He is a utility back that can play as a wing, centre or fullback.

References

South African rugby union players
Living people
1996 births
Rugby union players from Pretoria
Rugby union centres
Rugby union wings
Rugby union fullbacks
Pumas (Currie Cup) players
Sharks (Currie Cup) players
Griffons (rugby union) players